A number of beauty pageants may be known as variants of Miss México, including:

Señorita México (1952 - present), beauty pageant that chooses Mexico's representatives to Miss Lumiere International World and Miss Tourism
Mexicana Universal (1994 - present), beauty pageant that chooses Mexico's representatives to Miss Universe, Miss International, Miss Charm International and Reina Hispanoamericana
Miss Mexico Organization (2013 - present), beauty pageant that chooses Mexico's representative to Miss World, Miss Grand International, Miss United Continents, Top Model of the World, Miss Global City, Miss Costa Maya International and Reina Internacional del Café
Miss Earth Mexico (2002 - present), beauty pageant that chooses Mexico's representative to Miss Earth, Miss Supranational, Miss Intercontinental, Miss Eco International, Miss Teen Eco International, Miss Polo International, The Miss Globe, Miss Freedom of the World, Miss Panamerican International, Miss Atlantico International and International Tourism Image Ambassador
Embajadora México (2019 - present), beauty pageant that chooses Mexico's representative to Miss Planet International
Miss Globe México (2015 - present), beauty pageant that chooses Mexico's representative to Miss Glam World, Miss Tourism World, Miss Tourism Planet, Miss Tourism Queen Worldwide, Miss Americas Caribbean World, Face of Beauty International, Reina Mundial del Banano, Reina Internacional del Tropico, Reina Internacional de la Cosecha Llanera, Miss Petite World, Teen Globe International and Universal Petite
Organización Raúl Villalobos (??? - present), beauty pageant that chooses Mexico's representative to World Miss University, Best Model of the World, Miss All Nations, Miss Tourism International, Miss Model of the Universe, Miss Turismo Latina, Miss Tourism Worldwide, Miss Supermodel Worldwide and Miss Crystal Angel International
Reinas de México (??? - present), beauty pageant that chooses Mexico's representative to Miss Progress International, Miss Latinoamerica, Miss Tourism Universe and Miss Heritage Global

 
Beauty pageants in Mexico